Feni is a city in the Chittagong Division of south-eastern Bangladesh. It is the headquarters of Feni Sadar Upazila and Feni District. The city has a population of about 265,000, making it the 18th largest city in Bangladesh. Feni is the oldest municipality in this region, established in 1958.

History
Feni city came into existence  in 1929. It learnt that,  in the long past this area was under marshy land and meaning Feni. The continuous silting process made it possible for human habitation to be established, as a result of which people far and near called this area Feni.

Administration
Feni city consists of a paurashava with 18 wards and 35 mahallas. The entire city is under paurashava.

Geography

Demographics
In 2020, Feni city's current population is about 270000 according to record of feni municipality .

Education
The literacy rate (7 years  and above 7 years) in Feni City is 81.7%.

Notable people
Khawaja Ahmed, member of the 1st Bangladeshi Parliament

See more
 Feni District
 Feni Sadar Upazila
 List of cities and towns in Bangladesh

References

Populated places in Feni District